Ella at Duke's Place is a 1965 studio album by Ella Fitzgerald and Duke Ellington, accompanied by his Orchestra. While it was the second (and last) studio album made by Fitzgerald and Ellington, following the 1957 song book recording, a live double album Ella and Duke at the Cote D'Azur was recorded in 1966.
Ella at Duke’s Place was nominated for Best Female Pop Vocal Performance at the 1967 Grammy Awards.

Track listing
For the 1965 Verve LP album, Verve V6-4070; re-issued by PolyGram-Verve on CD in 1996: Verve-PolyGram 529 700-2.

Side One:
 "Something to Live For" (Duke Ellington, Billy Strayhorn) – 3:35
 "A Flower Is a Lovesome Thing" (a.k.a. "Passion") (Strayhorn) – 5:00
 "Passion Flower" (Strayhorn) – 4:39
 "I Like the Sunrise" – 3:26
 "Azure" (Irving Mills) – 6:48
Side Two:
 "Imagine My Frustration" (Strayhorn, Gerald Stanley Wilson) – 4:49
 "Duke's Place" (a.k.a. "C Jam Blues") (Bill Katz, Ruth Roberts, Bob Thiele) – 4:13
 "Brown-skin Gal (in the Calico Gown)" (Paul Francis Webster) – 5:05
 "What Am I Here For?" (Frankie Laine)  – 5:35
 "Cotton Tail" – 3:41

 All songs composed by Duke Ellington, with the exception of "A Flower Is a Lovesome Thing" and "Passion Flower". Lyricists indicated.
 Recorded October 18,19,20 1965 at United Recorders, Hollywood, Los Angeles:

Personnel
Tracks 1-10

 Ella Fitzgerald - Vocals
 Duke Ellington - Conductor, composer, lyricist, arranger, piano
 Jimmy Jones - Arranger, piano
 Cat Anderson - Trumpet
 Mercer Ellington - Trumpet
 Herb Jones - Trumpet
 Cootie Williams - Trumpet
 Lawrence Brown - Trombone
 Buster Cooper - Trombone
 Chuck Connors - Bass trombone
 Johnny Hodges - Alto saxophone
 Russell Procope - Alto saxophone
 Paul Gonsalves - Tenor saxophone
 Jimmy Hamilton - Tenor saxophone, clarinet
 Harry Carney - Baritone saxophone, bass clarinet
 John Lamb - Bass
 Louis Bellson - Drums

Album produced by Norman Granz
Engineering by Val Valentin

References

1965 albums
Duke Ellington albums
Ella Fitzgerald albums
Verve Records albums
Albums produced by Norman Granz
Collaborative albums
Albums arranged by Duke Ellington
Albums conducted by Duke Ellington